Junta de Villalba de Losa is a municipality located in the province of Burgos, Castile and León, Spain. According to the 2004 census (INE), the municipality has a population of 115 inhabitants.

The Junta de Villalba de Losa is made up of four towns: Villalba de Losa (seat or capital), Mijala, Murita and Zaballa.

References 

Municipalities in the Province of Burgos